Egton with Newland is a civil parish in the South Lakeland District of Cumbria, England.  It contains eleven listed buildings that are recorded in the National Heritage List for England.  Of these, two are listed at Grade II*, the middle of the three grades, and the others are at Grade II, the lowest grade.  The parish contains the villages and settlements of Greenodd, Newland, and Penny Bridge, and the surrounding countryside.  The listed buildings include former industrial buildings at Newland, houses, bridges, and a public house.


Key

Buildings

References

Citations

Sources

Lists of listed buildings in Cumbria